Eino Leppänen (18 October 1916 – 20 January 1974) was a Finnish athlete. He competed in the men's javelin throw at the 1952 Summer Olympics.

References

External links
 

1916 births
1974 deaths
Athletes (track and field) at the 1952 Summer Olympics
Finnish male javelin throwers
Olympic athletes of Finland
People from Äänekoski
Sportspeople from Central Finland
20th-century Finnish people